Rahayu Saraswati Dhirakarya Djojohadikusumo (born 27 January 1986) is an Indonesian activist, politician, actress, presenter. She was a member of the Indonesian Parliament for the Gerindra Party from 2014 to 2019. During her time as a member of the legislature, she fought for women and children right and against human trafficking.

After failing to secure re-election in 2019, she was selected by her uncle Prabowo to serve alongside him as the deputy chairperson of the Gerindra Party for the period 2020 to 2025.

She was subject to misogynistic ridicule online after a photo surfaced of her showing pregnant belly which she had posted in 2015. After hearing about it from Tsamara Amany, she stated that it was confusing and saddening to see the photograph was used to attack her for political gain.

Family
Rahayu Saraswati Dhirakanya Djojohadikusumo was born on January 27, 1986, to Hashim Djojohadikusumo and Anie Hashim. Her last name derived from her great-grandfather Raden Mas Margono Djojohadikoesoemo, founder of Bank Negara Indonesia. Her uncle is Prabowo Subianto, who is the currently-appointed Minister of Defence of the Republic of Indonesia.
She married Harwendro Aditya Dewanto in 2014 and has two sons: Narendra and Wira.

Filmography 
Saraswati has starred in several action movies.

Movie

Television

References

External links
 
 

Members of the People's Representative Council, 2014
1986 births
Living people
Indonesian Christians
Women members of the People's Representative Council
Djojohadikusumo family